Eryngium creticum, or the field eryngo, is a species of flowering plant in the family Apiaceae native to Greece, Israel, Jordan, Lebanon, Palestine, and Syria. It is known in Lebanon and Palestine as قرصعنة and in Israel as חרחבינה מכחילה.

Description
It is pollinated by bees, beetles and flies, and tolerates poor soil. It is self fertile and require minimal water. The plant is edible and is found from October to April and will bloom from April to August. It is widely available in the Mediterranean. The name Creticum refers to the Island of Crete.

The plant is also used medicinally. Its stems are used to make an anti-tussive tea that is also used for kidney inflammation. It is also used as a remedy for scorpion stings in Jordan and to treat hypoglycemia.

References

creticum